
This is a list of postal codes in Canada where the first letter is M. Postal codes beginning with M (except M0R and M7R) are located within the city of Toronto in the province of Ontario. Only the first three characters are listed, corresponding to the Forward Sortation Area.

Canada Post provides a free postal code look-up tool on its website, via its applications for such smartphones as the iPhone and BlackBerry,  and sells hard-copy directories and CD-ROMs. Many vendors also sell validation tools, which allow customers to properly match addresses and postal codes. Hard-copy directories can also be consulted in all post offices, and some libraries.

Toronto - 103 FSAs

Note: There are no rural FSAs in Toronto, hence no postal codes should start with M0. However, a handful of individual special-purpose codes in the M0R FSA are assigned to "Gateway Commercial Returns, 4567 Dixie Rd, Mississauga" as a merchandise returns label for freepost returns to high-volume vendors such as Amazon and the Shopping Channel.

Most populated FSAs
 M1B, 65,129
 M2N, 60,124
 M1V, 55,250
 M9V, 55,159
 M2J, 54,391

Least populated FSAs
 M5K, 5
 M5L, 5
 M5W, 5
 M5X, 5
 M7A, 5

References

Communications in Ontario
M
Toronto
Postal codes M